The Electoral district of Morven was a single-member electoral district of the Tasmanian House of Assembly. It centred on the town of Evandale to the south of Launceston.

The seat was created ahead of the Assembly's first election held in 1856, and was renamed Evandale at the 1886 election.

Members for Morven

References
 
 
 Parliament of Tasmania (2006). The Parliament of Tasmania from 1956

Morven
1856 establishments in Australia